Mégantic—L'Érable is a federal electoral district in Quebec, Canada, that has been represented in the House of Commons of Canada since 2004.

The current MP is Conservative Luc Berthold.

Geography

Straddling the Quebec regions of Centre-du-Québec, Chaudière-Appalaches and Estrie, it consists of the regional county municipalities of Les Appalaches, L'Érable, and Le Granit. Notable towns include Thetford Mines, Plessisville and Lac-Mégantic.

The neighbouring ridings are Compton—Stanstead, Richmond—Arthabaska, Bas-Richelieu—Nicolet—Bécancour, Lotbinière—Chutes-de-la-Chaudière, and Beauce.

Its population is 87,078, including 69,617 voters, and it covers an area of 5,912 km².

History
The riding was created in 2003 from parts of Frontenac—Mégantic and Lotbinière—L'Érable ridings.

The 2012 electoral redistribution saw this riding gain territory from Beauce and lose a small fraction of territory to Lévis—Lotbinière.

Members of Parliament

This riding has elected the following Members of Parliament:

Election results

See also
 List of Canadian federal electoral districts
 Past Canadian electoral districts

References

Campaign expense data from Elections Canada
Riding history from the Library of Parliament

Notes

Quebec federal electoral districts
Thetford Mines